Diporiphora bennettii, also known commonly as the Kimberley sandstone dragon or the robust two-line dragon, is a species of lizard in the family Agamidae. The species is endemic to Australia.

Etymology
The specific name, bennettii, is in honor of Australian naturalist George Bennett.

Geographic range
D. bennettii is found in Kimberley region, Western Australia state, Australia.

Habitat
The preferred natural habitats of D. bennettii are forest and savanna.

Description
The tail is less than twice SVL.

Reproduction
D. bennettii is oviparous.

References

Further reading
Boulenger GA (1885). Catalogue of the Lizards in the British Museum (Natural History). Second Edition. Volume I. ... Agamidæ. London: Trustees of the British Museum (Natural History). (Taylor and Francis, printers). xii + 436 pp. + Plates I–XXXII. (Diporophora bennettii, new combination, p. 395 + Plate XXXI, figure 2).
Cogger HG (2014). Reptiles and Amphibians of Australia, Seventh Edition. Clayton, Victoria, Australia: CSIRO Publishing. xxx + 1,033 pp. .
Gray JE (1845). Catalogue of the Specimens of Lizards in the Collection of the British Museum. London: Trustees of the British Museum. (Edward Newman, printer). xxviii + 289 pp. (Gindalia bennettii, new species, p. 247).
Wilson S, Swan G (2013). A Complete Guide to Reptiles of Australia, Fourth Edition. Sydney: New Holland Publishers. 522 pp. .

Diporiphora
Agamid lizards of Australia
Taxa named by John Edward Gray
Reptiles described in 1845